Aulus Egnatius Proculus (fl. 3rd century) was a Roman military officer and senator who was appointed  either during the late second century or early third century.

Biography
Egnatius Proculus was a member of the second and third century , and it has been speculated that he was the son of Aulus Egnatius Priscillianus, a Roman philosopher. He is known to have filled a number of posts during his career, but no exact or even approximate dates can be assigned to them.

Egnatius Proculus was possibly the brother of Quintus Egnatius Proculus and Lucius Egnatius Victor.

Sources
 Mennen, Inge, Power and Status in the Roman Empire, AD 193-284 (2011)

References

2nd-century Romans
3rd-century Romans
Suffect consuls of Imperial Rome
Year of birth unknown
Year of death unknown